This is a list of sculptures in Notre-Dame de Paris.

Stone, copper, and bronze statues, including statues of the twelve Apostles that surrounded the base of the spire, had been removed from the site days prior to the 2019 fire as part of the renovations.

Sculptures in mosquede Paris

See also 

 List of bells in Notre-Dame de Paris

References

External links 

 

Notre-Dame de Paris
Sculptures in France
Cultural heritage of France
Notre-Dame de Paris
sculptures in Notre-Dame de Paris
Public art in France
sculptures in Notre-Dame de Paris